Samantha Wallace may refer to:

 Samantha Wallace (netball)
 Samantha Wallace, a character on the reality series Love & Hip Hop: New York

See also
 Sam Wallace (disambiguation)